Fjæra (historically called Åkrabotn) is a village in Etne municipality in Vestland county, Norway.  The village is located at the innermost end of the Åkrafjorden, at the mouth of Fjæraelva (Fjæra River).  The European route E134 highway runs through the village, where it enters the Fjæra Tunnel.  The highway connects Etne to the neighboring municipality of Ullensvang to the east.  Fjæra Chapel is located in the village.

The name of the village is derived from the word fjord.

References

Villages in Vestland
Etne